The Reebok Boston Track Club (RBTC) is an American training group sponsored by Reebok for professional distance runners (known as "RBTC Elite") as well as a separate recreational club for casual runners. RBTC Elite is supported by head coach Chris John Fox.

RBTC athletes won one medal at the 2018 NACAC Championships in Athletics.

Roster 

The Reebok Boston Track Club hosts the following athletes:

Men 

 Justyn Knight 
 Martin Hehir 
 Graham Crawford 
 Colin Bennie

Women 
 Amy-Eloise Markovc

References

External links
 

Track and field clubs in the United States
Running clubs in the United States
Reebok
Sports in Boston
2018 establishments in Massachusetts